Bignay wine, also known as bugnay wine, is a Filipino fruit wine made from the berries of the native bignay or bugnay tree (Antidesma bunius). It is deep red in color and is slightly sweet with a fruity fragrance.

References

External links

Fermented drinks
Philippine alcoholic drinks
Philippine cuisine
Fruit wines